Mercado Central or Mercat Central (English: Central Market) is a public market located across from the Llotja de la Seda and the church of the Juanes in central Valencia, Spain. It is one of the main works of the Valencian Art Nouveau.

History
In 1839, the spot had been used to inaugurate an open-air marketplace called Mercat Nou. By the end of the century the city of Valencia sponsored a contest for the construction of a new roofed market. A new contest in 1910 selected the present design by Alexandre Soler March and Francesc Guàrdia Vidal, who had got his architect's degree at the School of Architecture of Barcelona and collaborated with Lluís Domènech i Montaner. Construction began in 1914 and was not fully completed until 1928 by the Valencian architect Enrique Viedma Vidal.

Its unusual roof comprises original domes and sloping sections at different heights, while the interior seems to be lined in a range of materials such as iron, wood, ceramics and polychromed tiles. The beauty of the building stands out especially on account of the light that enters through the roof at various points, and through coloured window panels.

The style blends a modern Valencian Art Nouveau look but mirrors some of the architectural influences of nearby buildings such as the Valencian Gothic style Lonja de la Seda and the eclectic Gothic-baroque church of Sants Juanes. It celebrates the power of iron and glass to permit the construction of large open spaces, but still utilizes domes at crossings.

Most vendors sell food items, although souvenir shops and restaurants are located inside the market as well. It is a popular location for tourists and locals alike.

References

External links

 Website of the Central Market of Valencia
 Central Market of Valencia Turespaña, Spain National Tourism Agency.
 Valencia Tourism

Retail markets in Spain
Art Nouveau architecture in the Valencian Community
Buildings and structures in Valencia
Tourist attractions in Valencia